Babur or Baboor, also rendered as Babar or Baber, in Iran may refer to:
 Babur-e Ajam
 Babur-e Kord